Lytle is a station on the Port Authority of Allegheny County's light rail network, located in Bethel Park, Pennsylvania. The station serves area commuters, serving most notably as a park and ride station with 286 spaces. Many residences are also within walking distance, providing local access to Downtown Pittsburgh.

History

Lytle was originally a street level stop but reopened as a high-level platform park-and-ride station in 2004.

An old Montour Railroad trestle, the Summit Park Bridge, was located over the Lytle stop.  It was removed in 1993, 17 years after the last train ran across the bridge.

References

External links 

Port Authority T Stations Listings
Station from Google Maps Street View

Port Authority of Allegheny County stations
Railway stations in the United States opened in 1987
Silver Line (Pittsburgh)